Gregg S. Hymowitz (born November 16, 1965) is chairman, chief executive officer and founder of EnTrust Global, a diversified alternative investment firm. He is known as an activist investor, approving a $650 million investment in Nestlé in May 2017.

Early life and education 
Hymowitz is from Bellmore, New York. In 1990, he graduated cum laude from Harvard Law School with a JD, and received a BA, Phi Beta Kappa, from the State University of New York at Binghamton in 1987. He was the 1985 Harry S. Truman Scholar from New York, the 1987 British Hansard Society Scholar and the 2004 recipient of the Governor's Committee on Scholastic Achievement Award.

Career 
He began his career as an attorney at Skadden, Arps, Slate, Meagher & Flom where he focused on mergers and acquisitions before joining Goldman, Sachs & Co. as a vice president in 1992. In 1997 he left Goldman to establish Entrust Global (originally EnTrust Capital), which had over $1.1 billion in assets by December of that year. The firm joined The Permal Group in 2016, an investment management firm which was acquired and operated as a subsidiary by Legg Mason since 2005, assuming the name of EnTrustPermal, and rebranded to EnTrust Global in 2019. 

In 2016, the firm launched a maritime lending vehicle. As of March 2019, they have more than fifty vessels financed with a size of an investment of over a billion dollars in commitments, of which $600 has been deployed, followed by the aviation business which provides direct lending to aircraft companies, taking advantage of the lack of bank lenders in the maritime sector. 

As of February 2020, Legg Mason owned 65% of EntTrust Global. In February 2020, Leg Mason was acquired by Franklin Resources for $4.5 billion. Instead of being incorporated into Franklin Resources as a result of the deal, Hymowitz agreed to make EnTrust Global an independent, private company by buying back Legg Mason's share of EnTrust. In April 2020, EnTrust launched Blue Sky strategy for investment in the global aviation industry which has raised $400 million.

He also serves as Chair of EnTrust Global's Investment Committee, Compensation Committee and Financial & Control Committee, and is a member of the Blue Ocean Executive Committee. In December 2020, EnTrust Global closed a $2.1 billion fundraising for the Blue Ocean Fund.

EnTrust Global and GMF Capital formed EG Acquisitions, a blank-check special-purpose acquisition company. EG Acquisitions filed for a $250 million IPO in April 2021. In October 2022, it was announced that EG Acquisitions would merge with private jet company flyExclusive, taking the company public with a combined value of $600 million.

EnTrust Global raised an additional $925 million for the Blue Ocean Fund between April and June 2021, and announced plans to acquire Maas Capital from Dutch bank ABN Amro.

Hymowitz manages Jolli Four, LLC, a real estate firm based in Wellington, Florida. In 2021, the firm sold an equestrian estate in Wellington to equestrian rider Logan Marksbury for $12 million.

Other work 
Hymowitz has been a panelist on numerous television shows such as Fox News' Cavuto on Business, CNN's Moneyline, Bloomberg Television, and CNBC's Squawk Box and Business Center. Hymowitz has also been involved in political fundraising, and was co-chair of the Dick Gephardt 2004 presidential campaign. In 2001, Hymowitz was a speaker to the US House of Representatives during hearings on whether conflicts of interest impacted the research of sell-side analysts.

Activist investing
In 2013 Hymowitz, as head of Entrust Capital, raised approximately $600 million for funds controlled by shareholder activists. In 2018 a large portion of the capital Hudson Executive Capital LP acquired for its stake in Deutsche Bank investment came from Hymowitz's EntrustPermal. EnTrust Global has a 25% stake in Alma Capital, and is a co-investor with the US-based activist firm Third Point LLC, with a $650 million stake in Nestlé.

Hymowitz has suggested that activist investing helps investors identify the best investment opportunities.

During the COVID-19 crisis of 2020, Hymowitz said that activist investing, so that one has an impact on company decisions, is a good investment strategy for the period of economic dislocation.

Philanthropy 
In 1995, Hymowitz established the Hymowitz Scholarship, which is awarded to full-time undergraduate students of Harpur College. Hymowitz endowed the Hymowitz Professorship of Global Health at Duke University, which was named after him. In 2017, Professor David Boyd became the inaugural holder of the chair.

Hymowitz participated in the FTI Consulting Great Charity Challenge which raised $2.5 million for Florida charities. He has also donated to the National Multiple Sclerosis Society, New York Cares, and The Retreat, a non-profit organization in The Hamptons which provides support to victims of domestic violence.

He was on the committee for the 2017 YAGP "Stars of Today Meet the Stars of Tomorrow Gala", and is part of the New York Leadership Circle for Mikva Challenge, a non-partisan civic engagement organization.

Board membership 
Hymowitz is on the Advisory Board of Quibi, a streaming video platform that offers short-form, mobile content. He was a member of the Board of Trustees at Montefiore Medical Center and served two terms as a trustee of the Riverdale Country Day School.

Personal life 
Gregg was married to Debby Hymowitz until 2004, with whom he had three children. Hymowitz later married Marcella Guarino Hymowitz, and they have a three children. In 2021, Hymowitz and his wife Marcella purchased five acres of ocean-front property in Parrot Cay from Bruce Willis for $6 million.

References 

Living people
1965 births
American money managers
American investors
Businesspeople from New York (state)
Harvard Law School alumni
American hedge fund managers
Binghamton University alumni
People from Bellmore, New York